Scheier  is a surname. Notable people with the name include:

Adam Scheier, American football coach
Edwin Scheier (1910–2008), American artist
Jacob Scheier (born 1980), Canadian poet
Libby Scheier (1946–2000), Canadian poet and short story writer
Mary Scheier (1908–2007), American ceramicist
Mindy Scheier (born 1971), American fashion designer
Shirley Scheier (born 1953), American artist
Jason Scheier (born 1980), Production Designer, Art Director, Visual Development Artist, and Instructor of the Arts